True Story is a 2015 American mystery drama film directed by Rupert Goold in his directorial debut, based on a screenplay by Goold and David Kajganich. Based on the memoir of the same name by Michael Finkel, it stars Jonah Hill, James Franco and Felicity Jones, with Gretchen Mol, Betty Gilpin and John Sharian in supporting roles.

Franco plays Christian Longo, a man on the Federal Bureau of Investigation's most-wanted list accused of murdering his wife and three children in Oregon. He hid in Mexico using the identity of Michael Finkel, a journalist played by Hill. The film premiered at the 2015 Sundance Film Festival and was released theatrically on April 17, 2015, in the United States. It explores the relationship that develops between the two men after journalist Finkel begins to meet with Longo in prison.

Plot
In 2001, Christian Longo, an Oregon man whose wife and three children have been discovered murdered, is arrested by police in Mexico, where he had been identifying himself as a reporter for The New York Times named Michael Finkel. Meanwhile, in New York City, Finkel, an ambitious and successful reporter, is confronted by his editors about a cover story he has written for The New York Times Magazine in which he has used a composite character as the focus of his story, violating basic journalism principles. Finkel briefly attempts to defend his actions but is unsuccessful and is fired. He returns home to his wife Jill and struggles to find work as a journalist due to his public firing from the Times.

In 2003, Finkel is contacted by a reporter for The Oregonian, seeking his opinion on Longo's assumption of his identity. Unaware of Longo's case, Finkel is intrigued and arranges to meet Longo in prison. During their first conversation, Longo claims he has followed Finkel's career and admired his writing. Longo agrees to tell Finkel his side of the crimes he is accused of in exchange for writing lessons and Finkel's promise not to share their conversations until after the conclusion of the murder trial.

Finkel becomes increasingly absorbed with Longo, who is likable but evasive about his guilt. Convinced the story will be redemptive, Finkel visits Longo in prison and corresponds with him for several months. Longo sends Finkel numerous letters and an 80-page notebook entitled "Wrong Turns," which contains what Longo describes as a list of every mistake he has made. Finkel begins to recognize similarities between Longo and himself, their handwriting and drawing, and Longo's letters and Finkel's journals. As the trial approaches, Finkel becomes increasingly doubtful that Longo is guilty of the murders, and Longo informs Finkel that he intends to change his plea to not guilty.

In court, Longo pleads not guilty to two of the murders but pleads guilty to the murder of his wife and one of his daughters. Finkel confronts Longo, who claims he cannot share everything he knows because he has to protect certain people he refuses to name. Greg Ganley, the detective who tracked Longo down and arrested him, approaches Finkel and claims Longo is an extremely dangerous and manipulative man. He tries to convince Finkel to turn over as evidence all his correspondence with Longo. Finkel refuses, and Ganley does not press him for an explanation.

At the trial, Longo takes the stand and describes his version of the events in detail. After an argument with his wife about their financial situation, he claims he had come home to discover two of his children missing, one of his daughters unconscious, and his wife sobbing, saying she put the children "in the water." Longo says he strangled his wife to death in a blind rage. He says he thought his other daughter was dead at first but realized she was still breathing and strangled her as well because she was all but dead. Finkel's wife, Jill, watches Longo's testimony. As the jury deliberates, Jill visits Longo in jail and tells him he is a narcissistic murderer who will never escape who he is.

Longo is found guilty and sentenced to death. After he is sentenced, he winks at Finkel, who, to his shock and rage, realizes Longo has been lying throughout their conversations, using him to make his testimony more believable. A short time later, Finkel meets Longo on death row. Longo tries to convince Finkel he discovered his wife strangling their daughter and then blacked out, so he has no memory of the murders. Finkel angrily tells Longo he will not believe any more of his lies and will warn the judge, when Longo appeals against his sentence, of Longo's manipulative nature. Longo retorts by pointing out Finkel's success with his book about their encounters, leaving the reporter shaken.

Finkel reads a section of his book, True Story, at a promotional event in a bookstore. Taking questions from the audience, he imagines Longo standing in the back of the room. Finkel is unable to respond. Longo says if he has lost his freedom, Finkel must have also lost something.

A year later, title cards reveal that Longo admitted to killing his entire family. The final title card says Finkel and Longo still speak on the first Sunday of every month. Finkel never wrote for the Times again, but Longo has contributed articles to several publications from death row, including the Times.

Cast

 Jonah Hill as Michael Finkel
 James Franco as Christian Longo
 Felicity Jones as Jill Barker
 Robert John Burke as Greg Ganley
 Connor Kikot as Zachary Longo
 Gretchen Mol as Karen Hannen 
 Betty Gilpin as Cheryl Frank
 John Sharian as Lincoln County Lobby Sheriff
 Robert Stanton as Jeffrey Gregg
 Maria Dizzia as Mary Jane Longo
 Genevieve Angelson as Tina Alvis
 Dana Eskelson as Joy Longo
 Ethan Suplee as Pat Frato
 Joel Garland as Dan Pegg
 Rebecca Henderson as Ellen Parks
 Charlotte Driscoll as Sadie Longo
 Maryann Plunkett as Maureen Duffy
 David Pittu as Marcus Lickermann

Production

Filming
Principal photography began in March 2013 in Warwick, New York and New York City. Brad Pitt produced, along with several others, and Fox Searchlight Pictures distributed.

Music
Marco Beltrami was hired on July 18, 2014, to write the film's music.

When Jill visits Longo in prison, she plays him a recording of "" (If you desire my death), a madrigal by the Italian renaissance composer Carlo Gesualdo. She explains that despite its beauty, she can not hear it without remembering the facts of the composer's life: that Gesualdo murdered his wife, her lover, and their child.

Release
The film was originally scheduled for a limited theatrical release on April 10, 2015. That release date was delayed for one week in favor of a wide release.

Reception
True Story has received mixed reviews from critics. On Rotten Tomatoes, the film has a rating of 45%, based on 169 reviews, with an average rating of 5.44/10. The site's critical consensus reads: "James Franco and Jonah Hill make a watchable pair, but True Story loses their performances—and the viewer's interest—in a muddled movie that bungles its fact-based tale." On Metacritic, the film has a score of 50 out of 100, based on 40 critics, indicating "mixed or average reviews".

Accolades

References

External links
 
 
 
 

2015 films
2015 crime drama films
2010s legal drama films
2010s mystery drama films
2010s prison drama films
American films based on actual events
American crime drama films
American courtroom films
American legal drama films
American mystery drama films
American prison drama films
Crime films based on actual events
Drama films based on actual events
Mystery films based on actual events
Films about journalists
Films scored by Marco Beltrami
Films set in New York City
Films shot in New York City
Fiction about familicide
Plan B Entertainment films
Fox Searchlight Pictures films
Regency Enterprises films
2015 directorial debut films
Films directed by Rupert Goold
2010s English-language films
2010s American films